Martin Arlofelt (born 25 January 1985) is a Danish former professional footballer who played as a defender, who played in the Danish Superliga championship for HB Køge. He played one game for the Denmark national under-19 football team.

Career
Arlofelt started his youth career in Danish Superliga club Brøndby IF, but did not play any senior games for the club, before moving on in July 2006. He joined Danish 1st Division team Køge Boldklub, where he made his senior debut and recorded strong performances. In 2008, he moved on to 1st Division rivals Herfølge Boldklub. When Herfølge and Køge merged to form HB Køge in 2009, Arlofelt was on the roster. He helped the club win promotion to the Superliga, and played 16 games for the club in the 2009–10 Danish Superliga season which ended in relegation. As his contract expired in the Winter 2010, Arlofelt ended his playing career to focus on his education as an electrician.

References

External links
 Danish national team profile
 Danish Superliga statistics
 Brøndby IF profile

1985 births
Living people
Danish men's footballers
Danish Superliga players
Danish 1st Division players
Association football defenders
Brøndby IF players
Køge Boldklub players
Herfølge Boldklub players
HB Køge players
Footballers from Copenhagen